Murmur is the second EP from The Sight Below, released on October 27, 2009. It contains two new songs and three remixes of other The Sight Below songs (two from Glider and one from No Place for Us) by Eluvium, Simon Scott, and iconic Norwegian ambient producer Biosphere.

Track listing
Murmur
Wishing Me Asleep
The Sunset Passage (Biosphere Remix) [Vinyl Exclusive]
No Place for Us (Eluvium Remix) [Digital Bonus]
At First Touch (Simon Scott Remix) [Digital Bonus]

Reviews
FACT magazine Link
The Stranger 
Prefix magazine 
Surfing on a Stream Link

References

External links
Murmur @ Ghostly International
The Sight Below @ Ghostly International

2009 EPs
The Sight Below albums
Ghostly International EPs